Benjamin Wittes (born November 5, 1969) is an American legal journalist and Senior Fellow in Governance Studies at the Brookings Institution, where he is the Research Director in Public Law, and Co-Director of the Harvard Law School–Brookings Project on Law and Security. He works principally on issues related to American law and national security. Along with Robert M. Chesney and Jack Goldsmith, Wittes cofounded the Lawfare Blog. Wittes is also a member of the Hoover Institution's Task Force on National Security and Law. Wittes is a frequent speaker on topics of detention, interrogation, and national security, before academic, government, policy, and military audiences.

Early life and education
Wittes was born in 1969 in Boston, Massachusetts. He attended a Jewish day school in New York City, and earned a Bachelor of Arts degree from Oberlin College in 1990.

Career 
After a stint covering the United States Department of Justice and federal regulatory agencies for Legal Times, he worked as an editorial writer for The Washington Post, concentrating on legal affairs from 1997 to 2006.

Wittes has also written for The Atlantic and The New Republic, and has contributed regular columns to Slate, Wilson Quarterly, The Weekly Standard, Policy Review, and First Things.

In 2010 Wittes, along with Robert Chesney and Jack Goldsmith, co-found Lawfare, a blog dedicated to analyzing how the actions of the American government to protect the nation interacted with American law. In a post on Lawfare on January 28, 2017, reacting to Executive Order 13769, Wittes characterized the Trump administration as "malevolence tempered by incompetence." This description received widespread attention and re-use, including its being featured in a New York Times op-ed by Paul Krugman. Wittes contributed to the Lawfare podcast called The Report.

In 2020 Wittes launched the show In Lieu of Fun with journalist Kate Klonick. Conceived as an alternative to the presidential briefings on the ongoing COVID-19 pandemic the show aired live daily with Klonick and Wittes vowing to continue streaming until the pandemic was over. The show altered its format in 2021 to air only within the weekday and added Scott J. Shapiro and Genevieve DellaFerra as co-hosts. The show heavily features both guests and audience participation and is often political in nature.

Personal life
He is married to Tamara Cofman Wittes, a writer and former diplomat who served as Deputy Assistant Secretary for Near Eastern Affairs at the United States Department of State.

Bibliography

Books
 Unmaking the Presidency: Donald Trump's War on the World's Most Powerful Office (2020), with Susan Hennessey
 Notes on the Mueller Report: A Reading Diary (2019)
 Speaking the Law: The Obama Administration's Addresses on National Security Law (2015), written with Kenneth Anderson
 The Future of Violence: Robots and Germs, Hackers and Drones – Confronting A New Age of Threat (2015), written with Gabriella Blum. Introduces a new world of "emerging threats" – from students printing guns with 3-D printers to scientists' manipulations of viruses that can be recreated and unleashed by ordinary people – and attempts an authoritative blueprint for how the U.S. government must adapt in order to prevail and protect its citizens.
 Detention and Denial: The Case for Candor after Guantánamo (2010), details how U.S. detention policy is a tangle of obfuscation, rather than a conscious serious set of moral, legal, and policy choices. He says there is a need for greater coherence, clarity, and public candor from the American government regarding its detention policy and practices, and greater citizen awareness of the same.
 Law and the Long War: The Future of Justice in the Age of Terror (2008) is Wittes's analysis of how America came to an impasse in the debate over liberty, human rights, and counterterrorism and draws a road map for how the country and the next president might move forward.
 Confirmation Wars: Preserving Independent Courts in Angry Times (Rowman & Littlefield, 2006) addresses the transformations the judicial confirmation process has undergone in recent times. Wittes argues that these changes should not be understood principally in partisan terms, but as an institutional response on the part of the legislative branch to the growth of judicial power over the previous five decades.
 Starr: A Reassessment, Yale University Press (2002). Through ten hours of interviews with the controversial former independent counsel, Wittes examines the role that Ken Starr played in implementing the independent counsel statute and investigating the Clinton scandals. Wittes argues that Starr should be best understood as a decent man who fundamentally misconstrued his function under the independent counsel law.

As editor
 What Would Madison Do?: The Father of the Constitution Meets Modern American Politics (2015), edited with Pietro S. Nivola
 Campaign 2012: Twelve Independent Ideas for Improving American Foreign Policy (2012) provides short analysis of twelve policy issues facing America. Wittes edited Campaign 2012, and also contributed a chapter with Daniel L. Byman on how the next U.S. president should continue fighting al Qaeda while improving relations with Congress over terrorism policy.
 Constitution 3.0, Freedom and Technical Change, edited with Jeffrey Rosen (2011), details how technological changes that were unimaginable at the time of the Founding Fathers are challenging our notions of things like personal vs. private space, freedom of speech, and our own individual autonomy. Wittes also contributed a chapter on biosecurity, technologies of mass empowerment, and the U.S. Constitution.
 Legislating the War on Terror: An Agenda for Reform (2009) presents an agenda for reforming the statutory law governing counterterrorism and U.S. national security, balancing the need for security, the rule of law, and the constitutional rights that protect American freedom. Wittes both edited the book and contributed to a chapter with Stuart Taylor Jr., on refining interrogation law.

Reports and monographs
 "Against a Crude Balance: Platform Security and the Hostile Symbiosis Between Liberty and Security" (September 21, 2011). Wittes argues that we should think of liberty and security as existing in a kind of a "hostile symbiosis" with one anotherthat is, mutually dependent and yet also, under certain circumstances, mutually threatening.
 "The Emerging Law of Detention 2.0: The Guantánamo Habeas Cases as Lawmaking" with Robert Chesney, Larkin Reynolds, and the Harvard law School National Security Research Committee (May 12, 2011). Describes and analyzes the district and appellate courts' work on defining the rules of military detention, to date—and thus maps the contours of the nascent law of non-criminal counterterrorism detention that are emerging from the Guantanamo habeas cases.
 "Databuse: Digital Privacy and the Mosaic" (April 1, 2011): Wittes explores the possibility that technology's advance and the proliferation of personal data in the hands of third parties has left us with a conceptually outmoded debate over the protection of personal information, one whose reliance on the concept of privacy does not usefully guide the public policy questions we face.
 "Rationalizing Government Collection Authorities: A Proposal for Radical Simplification" with Wells Bennett and Rabea Benhalim (January 7, 2011). Wittes looks at part of the problem of regulating privacythe problem of access by government investigators to individuals' personal data stored in the hands of third parties and the inconsistent patchwork of laws that currently governs this sort of collection.
 "The Emerging Law of Detention: The Guantánamo Habeas Cases as Lawmaking" with Robert Chesney (January 22, 2010). Describes the diversity of opinion among the lower court judges to whom the inactivity of the Supreme Court, Congress, and the Executive Branch had effectively delegated the task of writing the law of detention.
 "The Current Detainee Population of Guantánamo: An Empirical Study" with Zaathira Wyne (December 16, 2008). Documents and describes, within the extant limits of the then-public record, the detainee population in American military custody at GTMO.

Articles

References

External links 
 Benjamin Wittes at the Brookings Institution
 
 

Living people
1969 births
American columnists
The Atlantic (magazine) people
Oberlin College alumni
American bloggers
Jewish American journalists
21st-century American non-fiction writers
21st-century American Jews
Brookings Institution people